Amina Priscille Longoh (born 1991) is a Chadian humanitarian organizer and politician. She has served as in the government of Chad as minister of women and the protection of early childhood since July 2020.

Biography 
Longoh was born in 1991 in Sarh, the capital of Chad's Moyen-Chari region.

She holds a bachelor's degree in business administration from Wintech Professional Institute in Ghana, as well as a master's in business administration from Sup’Management. After working in the oil sector for Glencore from 2013 to 2018, she left the firm to focus on humanitarian work.

In 2016, Longoh founded Tchad Helping Hands, a charitable organization with a particular focus on supporting Chadian women and girls. The foundation's genesis was a fundraiser she had organized for a 2-year-old girl who had eye cancer. The funds did not come through in time, and the girl died. Wanting to be able to respond to crises more quickly in the future, she launched Tchad Helping Hands later that year.

Longoh was appointed by President Idriss Déby as director of the Maison Nationale de la Femme (National Women's House) in 2019. She also served as education commissioner for the Panafrican Youth Union.

In July 2020, she was appointed by Déby as minister of women and the protection of early childhood. At age 29, she was the youngest minister in the newly reshuffled cabinet alongside the new youth and sports minister, Routouang Mohamed Ndonga Christian. She was one of nine women in the 35-member cabinet. She was retained in the cabinet reshuffles under transitional president Mahamat Déby, who took over after his father's death.

Longoh has advocated against the social and economic marginalization of women, and in favor of women's role in pan-African unity and identity.

The minister was the subject of a controversy in November 2020 when a photo circulated online of her holding a Quran, which was a gift from students at a Quranic school. Some Muslims believe that non-Muslims should not directly touch the holy book. She apologized, removing the photo from her social media profile and asking for forgiveness from the Muslim community.

Longoh is married and has two children.

References 

1991 births
21st-century Chadian women politicians
21st-century Chadian politicians
Women government ministers of Chad
People from Sarh
Living people